The  Pace Institute of Technology and Sciences-Ongole, a private college is located in Vallur Village, Prakasam District. It provides education for Engineering, Management and Diploma courses. It was established as a wing of Srinivasa Educational Society by brothers Maddisetty Vasu Babu, Maddisetty Venugopal, and Maddisetty Sridhar in 2008. The engineering stream has been affiliated with Jawaharlal Nehru Technological University, Kakinada. The college has been accredited by the National Assessment and Accreditation Council (NAAC) of University Grants Commission (India) with an "A" grade. It now has an autonomous status approved by the University Grants Commission. It was approved by All India Council for Technical Education and certified as an ISO 9001:2008 institution.

Programmes

Undergraduate Courses 

 Civil engineering
 Electrical & Electronics engineering
 Electronics & Communication engineering
 Mechanical engineering
 Automobile engineering
 Computer science 
 Information technology
 AI&ML
 AI&DS
 IOT&CSBT
 CSIT

Postgraduate courses 

 Computer science
 Mechanical engineering
 Electronics and Communication engineering
 Civil engineering
 Power electronics
 Master of Business Administration (MBA)

Diploma courses 

 Mechanical engineering
 Electrical & Electronics Engineering 
 Civil Engineering
 Electronics & communication Engineering

Research and development 
Pace family committed for different set of research works. Few of them include academic, social and corporate commitments. Moreover, Pace established with a separate R&D cell which is dedicated for various real-time industry requirements. Recently academic staff from different streams got funding from Central Government of India.

References 

Colleges in Andhra Pradesh
Universities and colleges in Prakasam district
Educational institutions established in 2008
2008 establishments in Andhra Pradesh